Kunle Afolayan  (born 30 September 1975) is a Nigerian actor, producer and director.  He is widely credited for elevating the quality of Nollywood movies though larger budgets, shooting on 35mm, releasing in cinemas, and improving cliché Nollywood storylines. After starting his film career as an actor in the 1999 political drama Saworoide, Afoloayan made his directorial debut in 2006 with Irapada, a Nigerian supernatural thriller, which won the Africa Movie Academy Award for Best Film in an African Language. His follow-on directing credits include The Figurine, Phone Swap, October 1, and Citation. October 1 was the winner of 16 major African movie awards in 2015 and the second highest grossing Nigerian film in Nigerian cinemas at the time of its release, a feat Afolayan was to repeat two years later with The CEO.  In 2021, the director signed a three-picture deal with Netflix. Swallow, the screen adaption of Sefi Atta's book of the same name was the first to be released in October 2021, followed by Aníkúlápó, an epic Nigerian fantasy released in September 2022. Afolayan has described the work as a "Game of Thrones recreated in Nigeria but with a better representation of our culture”.  Eleven days after its release, it was the #1 most-watched non-English Netflix original film.

Early life and career
Afolayan is of Igbomina-Yoruba descent, from Kwara State. He is the son of the theatre and film director Ade Love. He majored in economics and started out working in a bank while doing some casual acting, before deciding to move into full-time filmmaking and taking a course at the New York Film Academy. Since 2005 he has been active in the Nigerian film industry. He has made several films including: The Figurine: Araromire which was in the Yoruba and English languages and Phone Swap which featured Wale Ojo, Joke Silva, Nse Ikpe Etim and  Chika Okpala. The Figurine won five major awards in the African Film Academy and was successful in Nigerian movie theaters.

Afolayan appeared at the Subversive Film Festival in 2011 where he represented the Nigerian film industry with his colleague Zeb Ejiro. In May 2013, Phone Swap premiered in France at the first edition of NollywoodWeek Paris and won the Public Choice Award.

Personal life
Afolayan married Tolu in 2007, and they have four children. Their marriage ended in 2019. He identifies as a Free-thinker.

The filmmaker struck a deal with Netflix in 2021 to make three feature films, including a screen adaptation of Sefi Atta's book Swallow. He and the writer penned the script which reportedly has a major twist from the original story. The movie revolves around a woman who begins to consider going into drug trafficking in mid-'80s Lagos.

Controversy
On 6 April 2015, Afolayan posted a tweet which implied that Igbos were the majority group behind copyright infringement in Nigeria. The backlash from fans led to an apology from Afolayan and an explanation that he was concerned about the piracy of his films, and most especially threats on the potential release of unlicensed copies of October 1, his latest film at the time. Shortly after his outburst, pirated copies of October 1 hit the market on 13 April 2015.

In an interview with Cable magazine, Afolayan was quoted as saying he does not watch Nigerian movies; ″Truth be told, I hardly watch them because I am keen on watching movies that will challenge me and change my orientation about certain things.″ and this led to him receiving several heated responses from fans and some colleagues in the Nigerian movie industry. Days after this News broke, Afolayan shared a video on social media where he announced that he had been taken out of context and then tried to set the record straight

Golden Effects Pictures
Afolayan is the CEO of Golden Effects Pictures, a Nigerian film and production company incorporated in 2005. Ambassador Audu Kadiri, Nigeria's Permanent Representative to the United Nations (UN) office in Geneva said, "the acclaimed producer came to limelight as a film producer in Nigeria when he founded the Golden Effect Pictures Limited, a film production company that produces and releases high-quality films." The company's feature films include Irapada, The Figurine, Phone Swap, October 1, Roti, Omugwo, The Tribunal, The CEO and Mokalik.

Filmography

Awards and nominations

See also 
 List of Yoruba people
 List of Nigerian film producers

References

External links 

Living people
Yoruba filmmakers
New York Film Academy alumni
Male actors from Lagos
Nigerian film directors
Nigerian male film actors
Yoruba male actors
21st-century Nigerian male actors
1974 births
Male actors in Yoruba cinema
Yoruba-language film directors
English-language film directors from Nigeria
Kunle
Filmmakers from Lagos
Nigerian male television actors
People from Kwara State